John David Caputo (born October 26, 1940) is an American philosopher who is the Thomas J. Watson Professor of Religion Emeritus at Syracuse University and the David R. Cook Professor of Philosophy Emeritus at Villanova University. Caputo is a major figure associated with postmodern Christianity and continental philosophy of religion, as well as the founder of the theological movement known as weak theology. Much of Caputo's work focuses on hermeneutics, phenomenology, deconstruction and theology.

Education 
Caputo received his BA in 1962 from La Salle University, his MA in 1964 from Villanova University, and his PhD in philosophy in 1968 from Bryn Mawr College.

Work
Caputo is a specialist in contemporary continental philosophy, with a particular expertise in phenomenology, hermeneutics, and deconstruction. Over the years, he has developed a deconstructive hermeneutics that he calls radical hermeneutics, which is highly influenced by the thought of the French philosopher, Jacques Derrida. Additionally, Caputo has developed a distinctive approach to religion that he calls weak theology. Recently, his most important work has been to rebut the charges of relativism made against deconstruction by showing that deconstruction is organized around the affirmation of certain unconditional ethical and political claims.

Caputo has a special interest in continental approaches to the philosophy of religion. Some of the ideas Caputo investigates in his work include the "religion without religion" of Jacques Derrida; the "theological turn" taken in recent French phenomenology by Jean-Luc Marion and others; the critique of ontotheology; the dialogue of contemporary philosophy with Augustine of Hippo and Paul of Tarsus; and medieval metaphysics and mysticism. In the past, Caputo has taught courses on Søren Kierkegaard, Friedrich Nietzsche, Edmund Husserl, Martin Heidegger, Emmanuel Levinas, Gilles Deleuze, and Jacques Derrida.

Reception

In reviewing Caputo's Cross and Cosmos, Denver Seminary professor Douglas Groothuis stated that for Caputo "God does not exist but insists... I cannot make out how Caputo can affirm the nonexistence of God while claiming God does something. It is simply illogical... A unicorn cannot insist on being fed -- or insist on anything else -- if it does not exist."

Positions held

Caputo taught philosophy at Villanova University from 1968 to 2004.  He was appointed the David R. Cook Professor of Philosophy at Villanova University in 1993. Caputo was the Thomas J. Watson Professor of Religion at Syracuse University, where he taught in both the departments of philosophy and religion from 2004 until his retirement in 2011.  He is emeritus professor at both Villanova University and Syracuse University and continues to write and lecture in both the United States and Europe. He is active in the American Philosophical Association, the American Academy of Religion, the Society for Phenomenology and Existential Philosophy and he chairs the board of editors for the Journal for Cultural and Religious Theory.

Notable former students of Caputo
 Theodore George
 Michael Brogan
 James K. A. Smith, professor, philosopher and theologian
 Nythamar de Oliveira, professor, philosopher and theologian

Bibliography

(1978) The Mystical Element in Heidegger's Thought (Ohio University Press)
(1982) Heidegger and Aquinas (Fordham University Press)
(1986) The Mystical Element in Heidegger's Thought (Fordham University Press paperback with a new "Introduction")
(1987) Radical Hermeneutics: Repetition, Deconstruction and the Hermeneutic Project (Indiana University Press)
(1993) Against Ethics - Contributions to a Poetics of Obligation with Constant Reference to Deconstruction (Indiana University Press)
(1993) Demythologizing Heidegger (Indiana University Press)
(1997) The Prayers and Tears of Jacques Derrida (Indiana University Press)
(1997) Deconstruction in a Nutshell: A Conversation with Jacques Derrida, ed./auth. (Fordham University Press)
(2000) More Radical Hermeneutics: On Not Knowing Who We Are (Indiana University Press)
(2001) On Religion (Routledge Press)
(2006) Philosophy and Theology (Abingdon Press)
(2006) The Weakness of God (Indiana University Press)
(2007) After the Death of God, with Gianni Vattimo (Columbia University Press)
(2007) How to Read Kierkegaard (Granta; Norton, 2008)
(2007) What Would Jesus Deconstruct?: The Good News of Postmodernism for the Church (Baker Academic)
(2013) The Insistence of God: A Theology of Perhaps (Indiana University Press)
(2014) Truth [Philosophy in Transit] (Penguin)
(2015) Hoping Against Hope: Confessions of a Postmodern Pilgrim (Fortress Press)
(2015) The Folly of God: A Theology of the Unconditional (Polebridge Press)
(2018) Hermeneutics: Facts and Interpretation in the Age of Information (Pelican)
(2019) Cross and Cosmos: A Theology of Difficult Glory (Indiana University Press)
(2020) In Search of Radical Theology: Expositions, Explorations, Exhortations (Fordham University Press)
(2021) The Collected Philosophical and Theological Papers, Volume 3: The Return of Religion (John D. Caputo Archives)

See also
 Khôra
 List of American philosophers
 List of deconstructionists

References

External links
[https://web.archive.org/web/20070927212438/http://www.jcrt.org/archives/04.2/caputo.shtml

Online writings
John D. Caputo at philpapers.org
, by John D. Caputo
, by John D. Caputo
"Jacques Derrida (1930–2004)" (pdf), by John D. Caputo
"Scripture: A Prologue" (pdf), by John D. Caputo
"Without Sovereignty, Without Being: Unconditionality, the Coming God and Derrida's Democracy to Come" (pdf), by John D. Caputo
"Theopoetic/theopolitic" (pdf) John D. Caputo and Catherine Keller  'Cross Currents; Winter 2007; V. 57, No. 1'

Interviews
Interview with Carl Raschke
Interview at The Modern World
After Atheism: New Perspectives on God and Religion, Part 2 by David Cayley, Ideas, broadcast 1 May 2012

1940 births
American philosophers
Christian continental philosophers and theologians
Phenomenologists
Deconstruction
Heidegger scholars
Living people
Bryn Mawr College alumni
La Salle University alumni
Death of God theologians
Syracuse University faculty
American Christian theologians